Lucy Wood is a British fashion journalist specialising in women's consumer publishing.

Career 

Lucy Wood began her career at Grazia magazine in 2005 as Fashion News and Features Assistant, covering the global fashion and shopping trends. In June 2007 she left her position at Grazia to become Fashion News Editor at LOOK magazine, currently the UK's biggest selling women's glossy title. Interviewing designers, celebrities and writing fashion, style and lifestyle articles aimed at female readers led to being nominated for the PPA Association of UK Magazine and Periodical Publishers New Section Editor of the Year Award in 2008. She has contributed to The Sun, The Daily Mail, Visa Europe, Drapers Record and London Metro.

From May 2008 to June 2009 she edited bi-annual and online style magazine Random, a style publication which sold out in London following the launch of its first issue. Her fashion blog Fashion Editor resulted in Asos listing her Twitter as 'one to watch' at Asos Follows Fashion along with supermodel Jessica Stam, stylist to the stars Rachel Zoe and Hilary Alexander.

On screen and radio, she has appeared as a fashion expert on BBC television series Mary Queen of Shops, contributed fortnightly fashion slots for a BBC Radio Friday afternoon show, as well as various fashion segments for Asos, LOOK, Next and Miss Selfridge TV outlets.

References

External links 
 http://www.fashion-editor.com
 http://www.fashion-editor.blogspot.com
 https://web.archive.org/web/20110708034949/http://www.fashion-editor-portfolio.blogspot.com/

Year of birth missing (living people)
Living people
British women journalists
British fashion journalists